Charles Spencer Canning Boyle, 10th Earl of Cork and 10th Earl of Orrery (24 November 1861 – 25 March 1925), styled Viscount Dungarvan until 1904, was an Irish soldier and peer.

Biography 
Born to Lady Emily de Burgh and Richard Boyle, 9th Earl of Cork, Lord Dungarvan was appointed a deputy lieutenant of Somerset on 26 September 1885, and Grand Master of the Freemasons of Somerset from 1891.

He was commissioned as a Lieutenant into the North Somerset Yeomanry, a part-time regiment commanded by his father, on 1 July 1881. On 5 June 1886, he was promoted to captain, and on 27 May 1893 he succeeded his father as lieutenant-colonel commandant of the regiment. The Second Boer War broke out in October 1899, and following early defeats, the British government enlisted militia and yeomanry officers to increase their fighting force. Lord Dungarvan left Southampton in February 1900, and arrived in Cape Town the following month. He was seconded for service in South Africa during the Second Boer War on 3 April 1901, as commander of the 22nd Battalion, Imperial Yeomanry. He resigned his commission on 15 January 1902, when he was granted the honorary rank of Major in the Army. Later the same month he returned to the United Kingdom on board the SS Saxon, and became Lieutenant-colonel on the Establishment of the North Somerset Imperial Yeomanry. On 8 August 1903, he was granted the honorary rank of colonel. Dungarvan resigned his Yeomanry commission on 7 November 1903, retaining his rank.

He succeeded to the Earldom upon the death of his father, Richard Boyle, 9th Earl of Cork on 22 June 1904.

Lord Cork married, 21 November 1918, Mrs Rosalie Gray (d. 15 March 1930), daughter of William Waterman de Villiers, of Romsey, Hampshire, but had no issue. The earldom passed to his brother, the 11th Earl.

References 
 Kelly's Handbook to the Titled, Landed & Official Classes for 1903, 29th edition, London, p. 481.
 Townend, Peter, editor, Burke's Peerage, Baronetage, and Knightage, 105th edition, London, 1970, p. 646.

External links 
 
 

1861 births
1925 deaths
British Army personnel of the Second Boer War
Deputy Lieutenants of Somerset
Imperial Yeomanry officers
Charles
North Somerset Yeomanry officers
Irish soldiers
Irish Freemasons
10th
10th
7th